Gnathothlibus vanuatuensis is a moth of the family Sphingidae that is endemic to Vanuatu.

Description
It is similar to but differs from Gnathothlibus eras and Gnathothlibus saccoi by the complete absence of any long hair scales on the fore tarsi and clear reduction in length and thickness of the long hair scales covering fore tibiae in males. The upperside of the head, thorax and abdomen are uniform medium brown, with a thin lateral creamy-brown stripe running from the base of the antenna to the posterior of the thorax. The thorax has a wide creamy-brown patch posterior to labial palps.

The abdominal segments each have a reddish-brown posterior margin contrasting with the brown ground colour. The abdomen has five small lateral black spots surrounded by white. The forewing upperside ground colour is brown with darker markings. The subbasal band is short, irregular and slightly darker. There is a small black discal spot with a brown-white centre. The postmedian line is prominent, dark and runs mostly straight from the costa to the inner margin. The marginal band is lighter brown and irregular.

The forewing underside ground colour is burnt orange, speckled with dark brown distally, There is an irregular dark brown submarginal line running from the apex to the tornus The hindwing upperside ground colour is orange. The marginal band is dark brown from the apex to the tornus and the inner margin of the band irregular. The hindwing underside is orange-brown and heavily speckled with dark brown. The marginal area is darker from the apex to the tornus. The antemedian band is dark, mostly straight and thickest at the costa.

References

vanuatuensis
Moths described in 2003
Endemic fauna of Vanuatu